El Último Concierto (Spanish for The Last Concert) is a live album recorded by Argentine rock band Soda Stereo. The album was released in 1997 (see 1997 in music) as two different albums, El Último Concierto A and El Último Concierto B. The album was recorded live on 20 September 1997, at the River Plate Stadium, Buenos Aires, and it was the last concert by the band before their definitive break up. The DVD of the concert was released in 2005.

Some of the songs played are missing on both formats ("Sobredosis de TV" and "Juego de seducción"). The DVD is more thorough, featuring the two missing songs from the CDs, but excluding one ("Claroscuro").

CD Track Listing

El Último Concierto A
 En la Ciudad de la Furia (Cerati) – 6:38
 El Rito (Cerati) – 7:05
 Hombre al Agua (Cerati / Melero) – 6:29
 (En) el Séptimo Día (Cerati) – 4:56
 Canción Animal (Cerati / Melero) – 4:19
 Trátame Suavemente (Melero) – 4:04
 Paseando por Roma (Bosio / Cerati) – 3:42
 Lo que Sangra (la Cúpula) (Cerati) – 5:17
 Zoom (Cerati) – 3:33
 Signos (Cerati) – 4:31
 Ella usó mi cabeza como un revólver (Bosio / Cerati / Ficicchia) – 4:39

El Último Concierto B
 Disco Eterno (Alberti / Cerati / Bosio) – 7:35
 Planeador (Bosio / Cerati / Ficicchia) – 4:25
 Luna Roja (Cerati) – 5:36
 Té para 3 (Cerati) – 2:32
 Cuando pase el temblor (Cerati) – 4:54
 Claroscuro (Bosio / Cerati / Melero) – 5:36
 Persiana Americana (Cerati / Daffunchio) – 4:43
 Un Millón de Años Luz (Cerati) – 5:55
 Primavera 0 (Cerati) – 4:25
 Cae el sol (Cerati / Melero) – 4:50
 De Música Ligera (Bosio / Cerati) – 4:53

El Último Concierto C (DVD Track Listing)
All tracks are written by Gustavo Cerati, except where noted.

 En la Ciudad de la Furia
 El Rito
 Hombre al Agua 
 (En) El Séptimo Día
 Canción Animal 
 Juego de Seducción 
 Paseando por Roma 
 Lo que Sangra (la Cúpula)
 Signos
 Zoom
 Ella usó mi cabeza como un revólver 
 Disco Eterno 
 Planeador 
 Luna Roja 
 Te para Tres
 Sobredosis de TV
 Trátame Suavemente 
 Cuando pase el temblor
 Persiana Americana 
 Un Millón de Años Luz
 Primavera 0
 Cae el Sol 
 De Música Ligera

Personnel
Soda Stereo
Gustavo Cerati – lead guitar, lead vocals.
Zeta Bosio – bass guitar, backing vocals.
Charly Alberti – drums, percussion.

Additional personnel
Richard Coleman – additional guitar.
Alejandro Terán – additional guitar, viola, percussion, tenor saxophone.
Daniel Sais – keyboards.
Fabián Quintero – keyboards.
Tweety Gonzalez – keyboards.
Axel Krygier – keyboards, accordion, percussion, flute.
Andrea Alvarez – percussion.

Certifications

References 

Soda Stereo albums
1997 live albums
Sony Music Argentina albums
Live albums recorded in Buenos Aires